Royal assent is the method by which a monarch formally approves an act of the legislature, either directly or through an official acting on the monarch's behalf. In some jurisdictions, royal assent is equivalent to promulgation, while in others that is a separate step. Under a modern constitutional monarchy, royal assent is considered little more than a formality. Even in nations such as the United Kingdom, Norway, the Netherlands, Liechtenstein and Monaco which still, in theory, permit their monarch to withhold assent to laws, the monarch almost never does so, except in a dire political emergency or on advice of government. While the power to veto by withholding royal assent was once exercised often by European monarchs, such an occurrence has been very rare since the eighteenth century.

Royal assent is typically associated with elaborate ceremony. In the United Kingdom the Sovereign may appear personally in the House of Lords or may appoint Lords Commissioners, who announce that royal assent has been granted at a ceremony held at the Palace of Westminster for this purpose. However, royal assent is usually granted less ceremonially by letters patent. In other nations, such as Australia, the governor-general (as the Monarch's representative) has the right to dissolve the parliament and to sign a bill. In Canada, the governor general may give assent either in person at a ceremony in the Senate or by a written declaration notifying Parliament of their agreement to the bill.

United Kingdom

Before the Royal Assent by Commission Act 1541 allowed for delegation of the power to Lords Commissioners, assent was always required to be given by the Sovereign in person before Parliament. The last time it was given by the Sovereign in person in Parliament was during the reign of Queen Victoria at a prorogation on 12 August 1854. The Act was repealed and replaced by the Royal Assent Act 1967. However section 1(2) of that Act does not prevent the Sovereign from declaring assent in person if he or she so desires.

Royal assent is the final step required for a parliamentary bill to become law. Once a bill is presented to the Sovereign, he or she has the following formal options:
 grant royal assent, thereby making the bill an Act of Parliament.
 delay the bill's assent through the use of reserve powers, thereby invoking a veto
 refuse royal assent on the advice of his or her ministers.

The last bill that was refused assent by the Sovereign was the Scottish Militia Bill during Queen Anne's reign in 1708.

Erskine May's Parliamentary Practice advises "...and from that sanction they cannot be legally withheld", meaning that bills must be sent for royal assent, not that it must be given. However, some authorities have stated that the Sovereign no longer has the power to withhold assent from a bill against the advice of ministers.

Under modern constitutional conventions, the Sovereign generally acts on, and in accordance with, the advice of his or her ministers. However, there is some disagreement among scholars as to whether the monarch should withhold royal assent to a bill if advised to do so by his or her ministers.

Since these ministers most often enjoy the support of Parliament and obtain the passage of bills, it is improbable that they would advise the Sovereign to withhold assent. Hence, in modern practice, the issue has never arisen, and royal assent has not been withheld. This possibility did arise during the early days of the Premiership of Boris Johnson while the UK was negotiating a Brexit agreement with the EU. The Speaker of the House of Commons had allowed debate on a bill against the government's wishes and the government of the day was effectively in a minority on the most pressing parliamentary issue at the time. As such, there were rumours that the PM may advise the Queen (King) to withhold assent on an unfavourable bill. 

In December 2022 the Scottish Parliament passed the Gender Recognition Reform (Scotland) Bill. The UK government indicated that they may try to block it by withholding Royal Assent, using a Section 35 order under the Scotland Act, arguing that it would impinge on reserved matters.

Historical development

Originally, legislative power was exercised by the sovereign acting on the advice of the Curia regis, or royal council, in which senior magnates and clerics participated and which evolved into Parliament. In 1265, the Earl of Leicester irregularly called a full parliament without royal authorisation. Membership of the so-called Model Parliament, established in 1295 under Edward I, eventually came to be divided into two branches: bishops, abbots, earls, and barons formed the House of Lords, while the two knights from each shire and two burgesses from each borough led the House of Commons. The King would seek the advice and consent of both houses before making any law. During Henry VI's reign, it became regular practice for the two houses to originate legislation in the form of bills, which would not become law unless the Sovereign's assent was obtained, as the Sovereign was, and still remains, the enactor of laws. Hence, all Acts include the clause "Be it enacted by the Queen's (King's) most Excellent Majesty, by and with the advice and consent of the Lords Spiritual and Temporal, and Commons, in this present Parliament assembled, and by the authority of the same, as follows...". The Parliament Acts 1911 and 1949 provide a second potential preamble if the House of Lords were to be excluded from the process.

The power of Parliament to pass bills was often thwarted by monarchs. Charles I dissolved Parliament in 1629, after it passed motions and bills critical of—and seeking to restrict—his arbitrary exercise of power. During the eleven years of personal rule that followed, Charles performed legally dubious actions such as raising taxes without Parliament's approval.

The form of the Coronation Oath taken by monarchs up to and including James I and Charles I included a promise (in Latin) to uphold the rightful laws and customs quas vulgus elegerit. There was a controversy over the meaning of this phrase: the verb elegerit is ambiguous, representing either the future perfect ("which the common people shall have chosen"), or perfect subjunctive ("which the common people may have chosen").  Charles I, adopting the latter interpretation, considered himself committed only to uphold those laws and customs that already existed at the time of his coronation.   The Long Parliament preferred the former translation, interpreting the oath as an undertaking to assent to any law passed by Parliament, as the representative of the "common people".  The restoration Convention Parliament resolved the issue by removing the disputed phrase from the Oath.

After the English Civil War, it was accepted that Parliament should be summoned to meet regularly, but it was still commonplace for monarchs to refuse royal assent to bills. The Sedition Act 1661 even made it a treasonable offence to suggest that Parliament had "a legislative power without the king".  In 1678, Charles II withheld his assent from a bill "for preserving the Peace of the Kingdom by raising the Militia, and continuing them in Duty for Two and Forty Days," suggesting that he, not Parliament, should control the militia. William III made comparatively liberal use of the royal veto, withholding assent from five public bills between 1692 and 1696.  These were:

 The Judges Bill (vetoed 1692) would have regulated the fees charged by judges, and removed the right of the monarch to dismiss judges at will, stipulating that a judge should hold his commission "on good behaviour".  One contemporary observer reported that William's veto was recommended by the judges themselves, concerned that the regulation of their fees would deprive them of a lucrative source of income.
 The Royal Mines Bill (vetoed 1692) would have clearly defined the monarch's right to seize any mine containing gold or silver. A similar bill was again passed by Parliament and given royal assent in the following year.
 The Triennial Bill (vetoed 1693) would have ensured Parliament would meet annually, and that no parliament could last longer than three years.  A similar law, without the requirement for annual parliamentary sessions, was approved by the king in 1694 and became law.
 The Place Bill (vetoed 1694) would have prevented members of Parliament from accepting any office or employment under the Crown without standing for re-election. A similar provision was later approved by William as part of the Act of Settlement 1701.
 The Qualifications Bill (vetoed 1696) would have established property qualifications for members of Parliament.

Carafano suggests that William III considered the royal veto "his personal legislative tool".  By contrast, the last Stuart monarch, Anne, withheld her assent from a bill just once.  On 11 March 1708, she vetoed the Scottish Militia Bill on the advice of her ministers.  No monarch has since withheld royal assent on a bill passed by Parliament.

During the rule of the succeeding Hanoverian dynasty, power was gradually exercised more by Parliament and the government. The first Hanoverian monarch, George I, became heir presumptive and then king late in life; speaking English as a second language and being at first unfamiliar with British politics and customs, he relied on his ministers to a greater extent than had previous monarchs. Later Hanoverian monarchs attempted to restore royal control over legislation: George III and George IV both openly opposed Catholic Emancipation and asserted that to grant assent to a Catholic emancipation bill would violate the Coronation Oath, which required the sovereign to preserve and protect the established Church of England from papal domination, and would grant rights to individuals who were in league with a foreign power which did not recognise their legitimacy. However, George IV reluctantly granted his assent upon the advice of his ministers. Thus, as the concept of ministerial responsibility has evolved, the power to withhold royal assent has fallen into disuse, both in the United Kingdom and in the other Commonwealth realms.

In 1914, George V took legal advice on withholding royal assent from the Government of Ireland Bill; then highly contentious legislation that the Liberal government intended to push through Parliament by means of the Parliament Act 1911. He decided to not withhold assent without "convincing evidence that it would avert a national disaster, or at least have a tranquillising effect on the distracting conditions of the time".

It has been mooted that, in modern times, the government could advise the monarch to withhold royal assent, but that elected politicians should strive to avoid such a scenario.

Scotland

Royal assent is the final stage in the legislative process for acts of the Scottish Parliament. The process is governed by sections 28, 32, and 33 of the Scotland Act 1998. After a bill has been passed, the Presiding Officer of the Scottish Parliament submits it to the monarch for royal assent after a four-week period, during which the Advocate General for Scotland, the Lord Advocate, the Attorney General or the Secretary of State for Scotland may refer the bill to the Supreme Court of the United Kingdom (prior to 1 October 2009, the Judicial Committee of the Privy Council) for review of its legality. Royal assent is signified by letters patent under the Great Seal of Scotland as set out in The Scottish Parliament (Letters Patent and Proclamations) Order 1999 (SI 1999/737) and of which notice is published in the London, Edinburgh, and Belfast Gazettes.

Wales
Measures, which were the means by which the National Assembly for Wales passed legislation between 2006 and 2011, were assented to by Queen Elizabeth II by means of an Order in Council. Section 102 of the Government of Wales Act 2006 required the Clerk to the Assembly to present measures passed by the assembly after a four-week period during which the Counsel General for Wales or the Attorney General could refer the proposed measure to the Supreme Court for a decision as to whether the measure was within the assembly's legislative competence. Following the referendum held in March 2011, in which the majority voted for the assembly's law-making powers to be extended, measures were replaced by Acts of the Assembly.

Northern Ireland

Under section 14 of the Northern Ireland Act 1998, a bill which has been approved by the Northern Ireland Assembly is presented to Queen Elizabeth II by the Secretary of State for Northern Ireland for royal assent after a four-week waiting period during which the Attorney General for Northern Ireland may refer the bill to the Supreme Court. Assent is given by means of letters patent in the following form set out in the Northern Ireland (Royal Assent to Bills) Order 1999.

Between 1922 and 1972, bills passed by the Parliament of Northern Ireland were passed to the Governor of Northern Ireland for royal assent under the Government of Ireland Act of 1920, replacing the office of Lord Lieutenant.

Jersey and Guernsey
The lieutenant governors of the Bailiwick of Jersey and the Bailiwick and Islands of Guernsey do not have the authority to grant assent, nor, as proxies, as the British Crown's representative, deliver assent, to legislation emanating from the respective legislatures of these islands. The States of Jersey Law 2005 abolishes the power of the lieutenant governor to directly impose a formal veto to a resolution of the States of Jersey.

The equivalent of the royal assent is formally granted or formally refused on the formal advice of the Committee of Council for the Affairs of Jersey and Guernsey in pursuance of Queen Elizabeth II's Order-in-Council of 22 February 1952. A recent example when the equivalent of the royal assent was refused was in 2007, concerning reforms to the constitution of the Chief Pleas of Sark. (A revised version of the proposed reforms was subsequently given the equivalent of the royal assent.)

Isle of Man
Special procedures apply to legislation passed by the Tynwald of the Isle of Man. Before the 
Lordship of the Island was purchased by the British Crown in 1765 (the Revestment), the assent of the Lord of Mann to a bill was signified by letter to the Governor. After 1765, the equivalent of the royal assent was at first signified by the letter from the Secretary of State to the Governor; but, during the British Regency, the practice began of granting the equivalent of the royal assent to Manx legislation by Orders in Council, which continues to this day, though limited to exceptional cases since 1981. That year an Order in Council delegated to the lieutenant governor the power to grant royal assent to bills passed by Tynwald. The lieutenant governor must however refer any bill impacting on reserved powers (defence, foreign relations, nationality law, the relationship between the island and the United Kingdom and any matters relating to the monarch) to the British government for advice, on which he is required to act.

Since 1993, the Sodor and Man Diocesan Synod of the Church of England within the Province of York has had power to enact measures making provision "with respect to any matter concerning the Church of England in the Island". If approved by the Tynwald, a measure "shall have the force and effect of an Act of Tynwald upon the Royal Assent thereto being announced to the Tynwald". Between 1979 and 1993, the Synod had similar powers, but limited to the extension to the Isle of Man of measures of the General Synod. Before 1994, the equivalent of the royal assent was granted by Order in Council, as for a bill, but the power to grant the equivalent of the royal assent to measures has now been delegated to the lieutenant governor. A Measure does not require promulgation.

Relationship to royal consent

King's Consent and Prince's Consent are distinct from royal assent. They are required only for bills affecting the royal prerogative and the personal property and "personal interests" of the monarch, and are granted before parliament has debated or voted to pass a bill. They are internal parliamentary rules of procedure that could, in principle, be dispensed with by parliament. Consent is always granted on the advice of the government; the monarch never takes the decision to withhold consent.

Other Commonwealth realms
In Commonwealth realms other than the UK, royal assent is granted or withheld either by the realm's sovereign or, more frequently, by the representative of the sovereign, the governor-general. In federated realms, assent in each state or province is granted or withheld by the representatives of the sovereign. 

In Australia, in the special case of a Bill containing a proposal to amend the Constitution, the bill is submitted to a referendum by the people who must ratify the proposal before the Bill receives royal assent and the constitutional changes can be effected. All other Bills passed normally by the parliament become Acts of Parliament once they have received royal assent.

For Canada, these are the lieutenant governors of the provinces. A lieutenant governor may defer assent to the Governor General, and the Governor General may defer assent to federal bills to the sovereign. If the Governor General of Canada is unable to give assent, it can be done by a Deputy of the Governor General of Canada, currently a justice of the Supreme Court of Canada. It is not actually necessary for the Governor General to sign a bill passed by a legislature, the signature being merely an attestation. In each case, the parliament must be apprised of the granting of assent before the bill is considered to have become law. Two methods are available: the sovereign's representatives may grant assent in the presence of both houses of parliament; alternatively, each house may be notified separately, usually by the speaker of that house. However, though both houses must be notified on the same day, notice to the House of Commons while it is not in session may be given by way of publishing a special issue of the Journals of the House of Commons, whereas the Senate must be sitting and the governor general's letter read aloud by the speaker.

Development
While royal assent has not been withheld for a bill backed by the government in the United Kingdom since 1708, it has often been withheld in British colonies and former colonies by governors acting on royal instructions. In the United States Declaration of Independence, colonists complained that George III "has refused his Assent to Laws, the most wholesome and necessary for the public good [and] has forbidden his Governors to pass Laws of immediate and pressing importance, unless suspended in their operation till his Assent should be obtained; and when so suspended, he has utterly neglected to attend to them."

Since the Balfour Declaration of 1926 and the Statute of Westminster 1931, all the Commonwealth realms have been sovereign kingdoms, the monarch and governors-general acting solely on the advice of the local ministers, who generally maintain the support of the legislature and are the ones who secure the passage of bills. They, therefore, are unlikely to advise the sovereign, or his or her representative, to withhold assent. The power to withhold the royal assent was exercised by Alberta's Lieutenant Governor, John C. Bowen, in 1937, in respect of three bills passed in the legislature dominated by William Aberhart's Social Credit party. Two bills sought to put banks under the authority of the province, thereby interfering with the federal government's powers. The third, the Accurate News and Information Bill, purported to force newspapers to print government rebuttals to stories to which the provincial cabinet objected. The unconstitutionality of all three bills was later confirmed by the Supreme Court of Canada and by the Judicial Committee of the Privy Council.

In Australia, technical issues arose with the royal assent in both 1976 and 2001. In 1976, a bill originating in the House of Representatives was mistakenly submitted to the governor-general and assented to. However, it was later discovered that it had not been passed by the Senate. The error arose because two bills of the same title had originated from the House. The governor-general revoked the first assent, before assenting to the bill which had actually passed the Senate and the House. The same procedure was followed to correct a similar error that arose in 2001.

Ceremony

United Kingdom

In the United Kingdom, a bill is presented for royal assent after it has passed all the required stages in both the House of Commons and the House of Lords.  Under the Parliament Acts 1911 and 1949, the House of Commons may, under certain circumstances, direct that a bill be presented for assent despite lack of passage by the House of Lords.

A list of all bills that have thus passed Parliament is drawn up by the Clerk of the Crown in Chancery; this list is then approved by the Clerk of the Parliaments.  (The Prime Minister, other ministers, and Privy Counsellors do not normally have any involvement in drawing up the list.)  The Clerk of the Crown then prepares letters patent listing all the relevant bills, which are then signed by the monarch.

Officially, assent is granted by the sovereign or by Lords Commissioners authorised to act by letters patent.  Royal assent may be granted in parliament or outside parliament; in the latter case, each house must be separately notified before the bill takes effect.

The Clerk of the Parliaments, an official of the House of Lords, traditionally states a formula in Anglo-Norman Law French, indicating the sovereign's decision. The granting of royal assent to a supply bill is indicated with the words "Le Roy remercie ses bons sujets, accepte leur benevolence, et ainsi le veult", translated as "The King thanks his good subjects, accepts their bounty, and so wills it." For other public or private bills, the formula is simply "Le Roy le veult" ("the King wills it"). For personal bills, the phrase is "Soit fait comme il est désiré" ("let it be done as it is desired"). The appropriate formula for withholding assent is the euphemistic "Le Roy s'avisera" ("the King will consider it").

When the sovereign is female, La Reyne is substituted for Le Roy.

Before the reign of Henry VIII, the sovereign always granted his or her assent in person. The sovereign, wearing the Crown, would be seated on the throne in the Lords chamber, surrounded by heralds and members of the royal court—a scene that nowadays is repeated only at the annual State Opening of Parliament. The Commons, led by their Speaker, would listen from the Bar of the Lords, just outside the chamber. The Clerk of the Parliaments presented the bills awaiting assent to the monarch, save that supply bills were traditionally brought up by the Speaker. The Clerk of the Crown, standing on the sovereign's right, then read aloud the titles of the bills (in earlier times, the entire text of the bills). The Clerk of the Parliaments, standing on the sovereign's left, responded by stating the appropriate Norman French formula.

A new device for granting assent was created during the reign of King Henry VIII. In 1542, Henry sought to execute his fifth wife, Catherine Howard, whom he accused of committing adultery; the execution was to be authorised not after a trial but by a bill of attainder, to which he would have to personally assent after listening to the entire text. Henry decided that "the repetition of so grievous a Story and the recital of so infamous a crime" in his presence "might reopen a Wound already closing in the Royal Bosom". Therefore, Parliament inserted a clause into the Act of Attainder, providing that assent granted by Commissioners "is and ever was and ever shall be, as good" as assent granted by the sovereign personally. The procedure was used only five times during the 16th century, but more often during the 17th and 18th centuries, especially when George III's health began to deteriorate. Queen Victoria became the last monarch to personally grant assent in 1854.

When granting assent by commission, the sovereign authorises three or more (normally five) lords who are privy counsellors to declare assent in his or her name. The Lords Commissioners, as the monarch's representatives are known, wear scarlet parliamentary robes and sit on a bench between the throne and the Woolsack. The Lords Reading Clerk reads the commission aloud; the senior commissioner then states, "My Lords, in obedience to His Majesty's Commands, and by virtue of the Commission which has been now read, We do declare and notify to you, the Lords Spiritual and Temporal and Commons in Parliament assembled, that His Majesty has given His Royal Assent to the several Acts in the Commission mentioned."

During the 1960s, the ceremony of assenting by commission was discontinued and is now only employed once a year, at the end of the annual parliamentary session. In 1960, the Gentleman Usher of the Black Rod arrived to summon the House of Commons during a heated debate and several members protested against the disruption by refusing to attend the ceremony. The debacle was repeated in 1965; this time, when the Speaker left the chair to go to the House of Lords, some members continued to make speeches. As a result, the Royal Assent Act 1967 was passed, creating an additional form for the granting of royal assent. As the attorney-general explained, "there has been a good deal of resentment not only at the loss of Parliamentary time that has been involved but at the breaking of the thread of a possibly eloquent speech and the disruption of a debate that may be caused."

Under the Royal Assent Act 1967, royal assent can be granted by the sovereign in writing, by means of letters patent, that are presented to the presiding officer of each house of Parliament. Then, the presiding officer makes a formal, but simple statement to the house, acquainting each house that royal assent has been granted to the acts mentioned. Thus, unlike the granting of royal assent by the monarch in person or by royal commissioners, the method created by the Royal Assent Act 1967 does not require both houses to meet jointly for the purpose of receiving the notice of royal assent. The standard text of the letters patent is set out in The Crown Office (Forms and Proclamations Rules) Order 1992, with minor amendments in 2000. In practice this remains the standard method, a fact that is belied by the wording of the letters patent for the appointment of the Royal Commissioners and by the wording of the letters patent for the granting of royal assent in writing under the 1967 Act ("... And forasmuch as We cannot at this time be present in the Higher House of Our said Parliament being the accustomed place for giving Our Royal Assent...").

Independently of the method used to signify royal assent, it is the responsibility of the Clerk of the Parliaments, once the assent has been duly notified to both houses, not only to endorse the act in the name of the monarch with the formal Norman French formula, but to certify that assent has been granted. The Clerk signs one authentic copy of the bill and inserts the date (in English) on which the assent was notified to the two houses after the title of the act.

Australia and New Zealand 
In Australia, the formal ceremony of granting assent in parliament has not been regularly used since the early 20th century. Today, the bill is sent to the governor's or the governor-general's residence by the house in which it originated. The governor-general then signs the bill, and notifies the president of the Senate and the speaker of the House of Representatives, who in turn notify their respective houses of the governor-general's action. A similar practice is followed in New Zealand, where the governor-general has not granted the royal assent in person in parliament since 1875.

Canada

In Canada, the traditional ceremony for granting assent in parliament was regularly used until the 21st century, long after it had been discontinued in the United Kingdom and other Commonwealth realms. One result, conceived as part of a string of acts intended to demonstrate Canada's status as an independent realm, was that King George VI personally assented to nine bills of the Canadian parliament during his 1939 tour of Canada—85 years after his great-grandmother, Queen Victoria, had last granted royal assent personally in the United Kingdom. Under the Royal Assent Act 2002, however, the alternative practice of granting assent in writing, with each house being notified separately (the Speaker of the Senate or a representative reads to the senators the letters from the governor general regarding the written declaration of Royal Assent), was brought into force. As the act also provides, royal assent is to be signified—by the governor general or by a deputy, usually a Justice of the Supreme Court.

The Royal Assent ceremony takes place in the Senate, as the Sovereign is traditionally barred from the House of Commons. On the day of the event, the Speaker of the Senate will read to the chamber a notice from the secretary to the governor general indicating when the viceroy or a deputy thereof will arrive. The Senate thereafter cannot adjourn until after the ceremony. The speaker moves to sit beside the throne; the Mace Bearer, with mace in hand, stands adjacent to him or her; and the governor general enters to take the speaker's chair. The Usher of the Black Rod is then commanded by the speaker to summon the members of parliament, who follow Black Rod back to the Senate, the Sergeant-at-Arms carrying the mace of the House of Commons. In the Senate, those from the Commons stand behind the bar, while Black Rod proceeds to stand next to the governor general, who then nods his or her head to signify Royal Assent to the presented bills (which do not include supply bills). Once the list of bills is complete, the Clerk of the Senate states: "in His [or Her] Majesty's name, His [or Her] Excellency the Governor General [or the deputy] doth assent to these bills."

If there are any supply bills to receive Royal Assent, the Speaker of the House of Commons will read their titles and the Senate clerk repeats them to the governor general, who nods his or her head to communicate Royal Assent. When these bills have all been assented to, the Clerk of the Senate recites "in His Majesty's name, His [or Her] Excellency the Governor General [or the deputy] thanks her loyal subjects, accepts their benevolence and assents to these bills." The governor general or his or her deputy then depart parliament.

Other countries
In some monarchies—such as Belgium, Denmark, Japan, Malaysia, the Netherlands, Norway, Spain, and Thailand—promulgation is required as well as royal assent. In Sweden, however, the monarch is since 1975 removed from the process and the government (i.e. the cabinet chaired by the Prime Minister) officially promulgates laws. In both cases, however, the process of assent and promulgation is usually a formality, whether by constitutional convention or by an explicit provision of the constitution.

Belgium
According to Article 109 of the constitution: "The King sanctions and promulgates laws". In Belgium, the royal assent is called sanction royale / koninklijke bekrachtiging (Royal Sanction), and is granted by the King signing the proposed statute (and a minister countersigning it). The Belgian constitution requires a theoretically possible refusal of royal sanction to be countersigned—as any other act of the monarch—by a minister responsible before the House of Representatives. The monarch promulgates the law, meaning that he or she formally orders that the law be officially published and executed. In 1990, when King Baudouin advised his cabinet he could not, in conscience, sign a bill decriminalising abortion (a refusal patently not covered by a responsible minister), the Council of Ministers, at the King's own request, declared Baudouin incapable of exercising his powers. In accordance with the Belgian constitution, upon the declaration of the Sovereign's incapacity, the Council of Ministers assumed the powers of the head of state until parliament could rule on the King's incapacity and appoint a regent. The bill was then assented to by all members of the Council of Ministers "on behalf of the Belgian People". In a joint meeting, both houses of parliament declared the King capable of exercising his powers again the next day.

Japan
Articles 6 and 7 of the Constitution of Japan mention the decisions of the parliament that require the approval of the Emperor. These are some of the so-called , and according to Article 3 of the Constitution, acts of state require the advice and approval of the Cabinet, which is the responsibility of the Cabinet.

Jordan
The constitution of Jordan grants its monarch the right to withhold assent to laws passed by its parliament. Article 93 of that document gives the Jordanian Sovereign six months to sign or veto any legislation sent to him from the National Assembly; if he vetoes it within that timeframe, the assembly may override his veto by a two-thirds vote of both houses; otherwise, the law does not go into effect (but it may be reconsidered in the next session of the assembly). If the monarch fails to act within six months of the bill being presented to him, it becomes law without his signature.

Luxembourg
While Article 34 of the constitution of Luxembourg formerly required the grand duke or duchess to sanction and promulgate a new law for it to take effect, the required sanction was removed in 2008, after Grand Duke Henri informed his prime minister that he could not in good conscience assent to a bill to permit euthanasia in the country. The subsequent constitutional amendment removed the need for assent while retaining the need for the Grand Duke to promulgate new laws. The Grand-Duke's signature is still required, but does not imply assent, only promulgation (announcement that the law has been enacted by Parliament). The Grand-Duke did sign the Euthanasia Act under this new constitutional arrangement.

Norway
Articles 77–79 of the Norwegian constitution specifically grant the monarch of Norway the right to withhold royal assent from any bill passed by the Storting. Should the monarch ever choose to exercise this privilege, Article 79 provides a means by which his veto may be over-ridden: "If a Bill has been passed unaltered by two sessions of the Storting, constituted after two separate successive elections and separated from each other by at least two intervening sessions of the Storting, without a divergent Bill having been passed by any Storting in the period between the first and last adoption, and it is then submitted to the King with a petition that His Majesty shall not refuse his assent to a Bill which, after the most mature deliberation, the Storting considers to be beneficial, it shall become law even if the Royal Assent is not accorded before the Storting goes into recess."

Spain
In Part II of the 1978 Spanish constitution, among provisions concerning the Crown, Article 62(a) invests the sanction (i.e. Royal Assent) and promulgation of laws with the monarch of Spain. Chapter 2 of Part III, concerning the Drafting of Bills, outlines the method by which bills are passed. According to Article 91, the monarch shall give his or her assent and promulgate the new law within fifteen days of passage of a bill by the Cortes Generales. Article 92 invests the monarch with the right to call for a referendum, on the advice of the president of the government (commonly referred to in English as the prime minister) and the authorisation of the cortes.

No constitutional provision allows the monarch to directly veto legislation; however, neither does the constitution prohibit the Sovereign from withholding royal assent. When the Spanish media asked King Juan Carlos I if he would endorse the bill legalising same-sex marriages, he answered: "Soy el Rey de España y no el de Bélgica" ("I am the King of Spain and not that of Belgium")—a reference to King Baudouin of Belgium, who had refused to sign the Belgian law legalising abortion. The King gave royal assent to Law 13/2005 on 1 July 2005; the law was gazetted in the Boletín Oficial del Estado on 2 July and came into effect on 3 July 2005.

Tonga
Articles 41 and 68 of the constitution empower the King to withhold royal assent from bills adopted by the Legislative Assembly. In 2010, the kingdom moved towards greater democracy, with King George Tupou V saying that he would be guided by his prime minister in the exercising of his powers. Nonetheless, this does not preclude an independent royal decision to exercise a right of veto. In November 2011, the assembly adopted an Arms and Ammunitions (Amendment) Bill, which reduced the possible criminal sentences for the illicit possession of firearms. The bill was adopted by ten votes to eight. Two members of the assembly had recently been charged with the illicit possession of firearms. The Prime Minister, Lord Tuʻivakanō, voted in favour of the amendment. Members of the opposition denounced the bill and asked the King to veto it, which he did in December.

Notes

References

Further reading
 "Act of Parliament" and "Parliament". In Encyclopædia Britannica, 11th ed. London (1911): Cambridge University Press.
 Bond, M. F. (1956). "La Reyne le Veult: The making and keeping of Acts at Westminster". "History Today", (Vol. 6, pp. 756–773). Retrieved 11 April 2007.
 Companion to the Standing Orders and guide to the Proceedings of the House of Lords  (22nd ed). Retrieved 11 April 2007.
 Hansard, House of Lords, 2 March 1967, columns 1181–1191
 "The Honourable John C. Bowen, 1937–50. Legislative Assembly of Alberta. Retrieved 11 April 2007.
 "Royal Assent Act. (2002, c. 15)" Department of Justice Canada, 2002. Retrieved 14 August 2012.
 "Queen and Prince Charles using power of veto over new laws, Whitehall documents reveal" The Telegraph

External links
.
Royal Assent, UK Parliament.Royal Assent

Westminster system
Constitution of the United Kingdom
Royal prerogative
Legal terminology